A megastructure is a very large artificial object.

Megastructure may also refer to:

Megastructure (planning concept), a concept where a city or large settlement can be housed in one building
Megastructures (TV series), a television series covering feats of engineering